Wichard von Moellendorff may refer to:

 Wichard Joachim Heinrich von Möllendorf (1724 – 1816), Prussian general
 Wichard von Moellendorff (engineer) (1881 – 1937), German engineer and economist